Ed Gein was an American grindcore band, based in Syracuse, New York. The band consisted of Graham Reynolds (guitar, vocals), Aaron Jenkins (bass, vocals) and Jesse Daino (drums, vocals). The band takes its name from the American murderer of the same name. The band is best known for its second album, Judas Goats and Dieseleaters (2005). The follow-up record, titled Bad Luck, was released in 2011.

Ed Gein's music has been labeled as grindcore, metalcore, mathcore and noise rock, featuring influences from thrash metal.
On their third album, Bad Luck, the band shifted from their previous technical grindcore in favor of a more hardcore punk-influenced sound. The band's lyrics, primarily written by bassist Aaron Jenkins, are politically charged and features social commentary, on topics including racism in the United States, sexism, homophobia and bureaucracy.

On April 11, 2018, it was announced the band had split up and the members would be forming a new band called Shadow Snakes.

Band members
 Graham Reynolds – guitar, vocals
 Aaron Jenkins – bass, vocals
 Jesse Daino – drums, vocals

Discography
Studio albums
 It's a Shame That a Family Can Be Torn Apart by Something as Simple as a Pack of Wild Dogs (2002)
 Judas Goats and Dieseleaters (2005)
 Bad Luck (2011)

EPs
 Ed Gein (2002)
 Smoked (2016)

Compilations
 It's a Shame (2005)

References

External links
 

American grindcore musical groups
Metalcore musical groups from New York (state)
American musical trios
American noise rock music groups
Musical groups from Syracuse, New York
Heavy metal musical groups from New York (state)
Hardcore punk groups from New York (state)
Cultural depictions of Ed Gein